Neslihan Yiğit (born February 26, 1994) is a Turkish badminton player. She won the women's singles title at the 2013 Islamic Solidarity Games, 2013, 2018 Mediterranean Games and the women's doubles title at the 2013 Mediterranean Games. Yiğit also won the bronze medals at the 2015 European Games and at the 2021 and 2022 European Championships.

Career 
Neslihan Yiğit became silver medalist in singles and doubles at the U17 European Championship held 2009 in Medvode, Slovenia. At the 2011 Spanish Junior International, she reached to semi finals in singles, won the girls' doubles title, and became the runner-up in the mixed doubles.

She competed at various international tournaments in singles and doubles with her partner Özge Bayrak, and won titles in the years 2011–2012. The latest success enabled her to rise up to 28th place in the women's doubles world ranking list as of 20 August 2015 with Özge Bayrak. In the singles event, she reached a career-high of world number 34th in the world list on 1 October 2019. Yiğit ranked 7th in the World Juniors list.

She qualified as the first-ever Turkish badminton player for the Olympics.

She won the gold medal in the singles event and the bronze medal with the national team at the 2013 Islamic Solidarity Games held in Palembang, Indonesia. In June 2013, she won double gold medals in the women's singles and doubles event at the Mersin Mediterranean Games.

In 2021, Yiğit reached the quarter-finals of the Toyota Thailand Open,losing out to the eventual champion Carolina Marín. She won the bronze medal at the European Championships, defeated by the defending champion Marín in the semi-finals in straight games.

Yiğit was drawn in group A along with top seed and eventual champion Chen Yufei at the Tokyo Olympics, against whom she lost 14–21, 9–21. She won her other group game against Doha Hany 21–5, 21–5.

Yiğit reached the quarterfinals of the 2021 Hylo Open. After beating Aakarshi Kashyap and Kristin Kuuba in the first two rounds, it was the eventual champion Busanan Ongbamrungphan who stopped her in the quarters.

Yiğit made it to the quarter-finals at the 2021 Indonesia Masters She defeated  6th seed Michelle Li, and Marija Ulitina in straight games on the way. In the quarter-finals, She was stopped by P. V. Sindhu.

Achievements

European Games 
Women's doubles

European Championships 
Women's singles

Islamic Solidarity Games 
Women's singles

Mediterranean Games 
Women's singles

Women's doubles

European University Games 
Women's singles

European University Championships 
Women's singles

Women's doubles

European Junior Championships 
Girls' singles

BWF International Challenge/Series (26 titles, 28 runners-up) 
Women's singles

Women's doubles

  BWF International Challenge tournament
  BWF International Series tournament

References

External links 
 
 
 
 
 neslihanyigits on Instagram

Living people
1994 births
Sportspeople from Bursa
Turkish female badminton players
Badminton players at the 2012 Summer Olympics
Badminton players at the 2020 Summer Olympics
Olympic badminton players of Turkey
Badminton players at the 2015 European Games
Badminton players at the 2019 European Games
European Games bronze medalists for Turkey
European Games medalists in badminton
Competitors at the 2013 Mediterranean Games
Competitors at the 2018 Mediterranean Games
Competitors at the 2022 Mediterranean Games
Mediterranean Games gold medalists for Turkey
Mediterranean Games medalists in badminton
Islamic Solidarity Games competitors for Turkey
20th-century Turkish sportswomen
21st-century Turkish sportswomen